The Redcliffe Showgrounds is a showground in Redcliffe, Queensland for the annual Redcliffe Show the June holidays. Whilst the show is not on, it is home to the Redcliffe Darts club, Redcliffe Bingo as well as PCYC Over 35 soccer club. It used to be the main field for the Redcliffe Dolphins up until 1982 before the club moved to Dolphin Oval, but still serves as a training ground.

Prior to 2004, the Redcliffe Padres Baseball Club had called the Redcliffe Showgrounds home for 12 years, taking advantage of the great floodlighting facilities. In 2004, the club moved to the recently built field at Talobilla Park in Kippa-Ring.

References

Sports venues in Queensland
Baseball venues in Australia
Showgrounds in Australia